Line 16 of the Beijing Subway is a rapid transit line in Beijing. It will be  with 30 stations when fully completed. The line is fully underground.

Construction began in December 2013. An infill station,  was opened on 30 December 2017. The southern section to  opened on 31 December 2022.

The line is operated by the Beijing MTR Corporation Limited and uses CNR Changchun DKZ93 and CSR Sifang SFM40 eight-car high-capacity wide-body Type A trains. Line 16's color is dark-moderate green.

Route
The line starts at the west end of Beiqing Road (北清路) just outside of the 6th Ring Road and follows the road east to Yongfeng Road (永丰路) where it turns south towards the city.

History

In 2009, Line 16 was among the 198 major urban planning projects listed by Beijing's development and reform commission.

According to the June 2010 plans, the northern section of Line 16 will replace the originally planned Line 4 northern extension and run  from Bei'anhe in Haidian District, south to Xiaoyueyuan near the Lugou Bridge in Fengtai District. The line would begin near Bei'anhe, and provide access to parts of Haidian, north of the foothills the Western Hills that extend into Haidian District. For this reason, that section of the line was also referred to as the Haidian Shanhou (literal translation Haidian Back Mountain) Line because it begins on the backside of the low-lying range that extends from the Fragrant Hills to the Summer Palace. Points of interest that the line may pass along route to Xiaoyueyuan in the south include the Summer Palace, Haidian Gymnasium, National Library, Purple Bamboo Park, Beijing Zoo, Chegongzhuang West Road, Sanlihe, Wanshou Temple, Lize Shangwuqu (Lize Business District), and the Beijing Fengtai railway station. The proposal was scaled back with the removal of the Haidian Shanhou section in December 2010, reducing the line to just , from Suzhoujie to Wanping. But the northern section was subsequently restored months later, bringing the line length .

The Beijing Municipal Commission of Urban Planning released the plans for several subway stations in 2013. Construction of the line began in December 2013.

The northern section, from Bei'anhe to Xiyuan, except for Nongda Nanlu, opened on December 31, 2016. Nongda Nanlu opened on December 30, 2017. In April 2020, Beijing Municipal Commission of Development and Reform decided to build an infill station on the southern section of Line 16:  (now renamed to ).

On December 31, 2020, the middle section from Xiyuan to Ganjiakou opened. (Suzhou Jie and Erligou stations were not opened)

On December 31, 2021, a one-station extension to  opened.

On March 18, 2023,  station started operation.

Future Development

List of Stations
List of stations from north to south.

Rolling Stock

Formation

Notes

References

Sources

Beijing Subway lines
MTR Corporation
Railway lines opened in 2016
2016 establishments in China
1500 V DC railway electrification